Christ the Redeemer is an icon discovered by accident in a dilapidated woodshed near Zvenigorod in 1919. With several other icons stored nearby, it was attributed as the work of the great Andrei Rublev, painted for one of Zvenigorod cathedrals in the 1420s. It is exhibited in the Tretyakov Gallery of Moscow. 

Paintings depicting Jesus
Russian icons
Tourist attractions in Moscow
1410s paintings